Maryse Morandini (28 December 1932 – 12 November 2018) was a French swimmer. She competed in the women's 4 × 100 metre freestyle relay at the 1952 Summer Olympics.

References

External links
 

1932 births
2018 deaths
Olympic swimmers of France
Swimmers at the 1952 Summer Olympics
Place of birth missing
French female freestyle swimmers